Traci Gere is an American politician from Maine. She is the representative for Maine House District 9. She is on the Labor and Housing committee. She defeated Steadman Seavey in the 2020 Maine House election with 58% of the vote.

References

Year of birth missing (living people)
Living people
Brown University alumni
Boston University alumni
21st-century American politicians
People from Kennebunkport, Maine
Women state legislators in Maine
Democratic Party members of the Maine House of Representatives
21st-century American women politicians